División de Honor de Béisbol 2014 is the 29th season since its establishment. 2014 season started on March 15 and will finish on 3 August.

Only nine teams plays the Spanish baseball top league and no one will be relegated to Primera División. Tenerife Marlins are the defending champions.

League table

Results

References

External links
Spanish Baseball and Softball Federation website

División de Honor de Béisbol